Thiruvarankulam  is a revenue block in Pudukkottai district, Tamil Nadu, India. It has a total of 48 panchayat villages.

Villages of thiruvarankulam block
1.	Alankadu  
2.	Arayapatti  
3.	Isugupatti  
4.	K.rasiamangalam  
5.	K.v.kottai  
6.	Kaikurichi  
7.	Kalangudi  
8.	Kallalangudi  
9.	Karumbirankottai  
10.	Kathakurichi  
11.	Kayampatti  
12.	Keelathur  
13.	Kothakottai  
14.	Kothamangalam, Pudukkottai  
15.	Kovilur, Pudukkottai  
16.	Kulamangalam North  
17.	Kulamangalam South  
18.	Kuppakudi  
19.	L.n.puram  
20.	Mangadu, Pudukkottai  
21.	Maniambalam  
22.	Manjanviduthi  
23.	Melathur  
24.	Nagaram, Pudukkottai  
25.	Neduvasal East  
26.	Neduvasal West  
27.	Palaiyur  
28.	Pallathividuthi  
29.	Panankulam  
30.	Patchikkottai  
31.	Pathampatti  
32.	Poovarasakudi  
33.	Pudukkottaividuthi  
34.	Pullanviduthi  
35.	S.kulavaipatti  
36.	Senthakudy  
37.	Senthankudi  
38.	Seriyalur Inam  
39.	Seriyalur Zamin  
40.	Thatchinapuram  
41.	Thirukkattalai  
42.	Thiruvarankulam  
43.	Vadakadu  
44.	Vallathirakottai  
45.	Vandakkottai  
46.	Venkitakulam  
47.	Vennavalkudy  
48.	Veppankudi

References 

 

Revenue blocks of Pudukkottai district